Back from the Front is a 1943 short subject directed by Jules White starring American slapstick comedy team The Three Stooges (Moe Howard, Larry Fine and Curly Howard). It is the 70th entry in the series released by Columbia Pictures starring the comedians, who released 190 shorts for the studio between 1934 and 1959.

Plot
The Stooges bid a fond farewell to their girls, Tizzy, Lizzy and Dizzy and join the war effort by enlisting in the Merchant Marines. While aboard ship, they have a brief altercation with Lt. Dungen (Vernon Dent), a Nazi spy, and then mistake a torpedo for a beached whale. Moe says they have to kill it, and it promptly explodes. After being lost at sea for several days, they come across the SS Schicklgruber and climb aboard. Now with fully grown beards, they encounter Lt. Dungen again, who does not recognize them. After realizing they are in with a nest of German sailors, they eventually overtake the crew and toss them overboard.

Cast

Credited
 Moe Howard as Moe
 Larry Fine as Larry
 Curly Howard as Curly

Uncredited
 Stanley Blystone as German Captain
 Neal Burns as German Sailor 
 Sally Cairns as Tizzy 
 Heinie Conklin as German Sailor
 Vernon Dent as Lt. Dungen
 Hubert Diltz as German Sailor 
 Lew Davis as German Sailor 
 Kit Guard as Crewman
 George Gray as German Sailor 
 Bud Jamison as German Petty Officer 
 Johnny Kascier as German Officer
 Sam Lufkin as German Sailor 
 Jack "Tiny" Lipson as Heavyset German Sailor
 Adele Mara as Dizzy
 Ruth Skinner as Lizzy
 Harry Semels as German Sentry
 Al Thompson as German Sailor

Production notes
Back from the Front was filmed over four days on July 24–28, 1942. It was the first Stooge film to feature an accompanying sound effect for the eye poke gag. A TWANG is heard when Moe pokes Lt. Dugen (Vernon Dent) in the eyes. Different sounds were used with varying rates of success throughout 1943 and 1944 — a nose honk is inappropriately used in  Higher Than a Kite, a xylophone in Crash Goes the Hash. The sound of a ukulele or violin string being plucked was used regularly after 1945.
Moe reprises his Adolf Hitler role from You Nazty Spy! and I'll Never Heil Again. The end was satire, with Moe telling the Nazis to use their heads and shoot out their brains, to which Stanley Blystone replies, "But mein Führer, we're Nazis. We have no brains." When the Hitler-disguised Moe sneezes and his toothbrush moustache flies off his face, he gets it back and refers to it as "my personality".

"Schicklgruber" is the surname Adolf Hitler's father, Alois Hitler carried for the first 40 years of his life, until he took the name Hitler (Hiedler) from his stepfather. While Adolf Hitler himself never carried the surname, the British made use of it for propaganda purposes since even to Germans, the name is laughable. The Stooges used it numerous times as the only name by which they would refer to Hitler.

References

External links
 
 
 Back from the Front at threestooges.net

1943 films
Columbia Pictures short films
The Three Stooges films
American black-and-white films
Cultural depictions of Adolf Hitler
American World War II films
Films directed by Jules White
1943 comedy films
1940s English-language films
1940s American films